Linda Hayes may refer to:

 Linda Hayes (singer) (1923–1998), American rhythm and blues singer
 Linda Hayes (actress) (1918–1995), American actress